Utkinton is a former civil parish, now in the parishes of Utkinton and Cotebrook and Tarporley, in Cheshire West and Chester, England.  It is entirely rural, and contains the villages of Utkinton and Cotebrook.  The A49 road runs through it in a north–south direction.  The parish contains 13 buildings that are recorded in the National Heritage List for England as designated listed buildings.  One of these, Utkinton Hall, is listed at Grade I, and all the others are in Grade II.  Other than the hall, some of the listed buildings are associated with the hall, and the others are domestic buildings, or related to farming.  In Cotebrook, the church and its former parsonage are listed.

Key

Buildings

See also
Listed buildings in Clotton Hoofield
Listed buildings in Delamere
Listed buildings in Oakmere
Listed buildings in Rushton
Listed buildings in Tarporley
Listed buildings in Willington

References
Citations

Sources

Listed buildings in Cheshire West and Chester
Lists of listed buildings in Cheshire